Dorig is a village located on the south coast of Gaua, in the Banks Islands of Vanuatu.

Its population counts approximately 250 individuals. Their language is also called Dorig.

External links
Satellite photo of Dorig.

Notes

Torba Province